Lindong is a town in the Balin Left Banner, Chifeng, within the Inner Mongolia Autonomous Region of the People's Republic of China. The town serves as the administrative seat of the Balin Left Banner.

Geography 
Lindong lies adjacent to Balin Left Banner's urban core. Large swathes of the town are forests and grasslands.

Climate 

Administrative divisions 
Lindong is divided into 33 administrative villages. The town also hosts 125 natural villages, which lack jurisdictional authority, and belong to the town's administrative villages. The towns administrative villages are as follows:

 Suobuliga Village
 Fushandi Village
 Daxinzhuang Village
 Xinglongdi Village
 Chaoyangyingzi Village
 Chaidamu Village
 Hantubai Village
 Taiping Village
 Panlonggang Village
 Shanwan Village
 Baolihantu Village
 Bayi Village
 Xianfeng Village
 Hongweizhuang Village
 Jingzigou Village
 Tulonggang Village
 Houxinglongdi Village
 Longfenggou Village
 Xinfangshen Village
 Gushanzi Village
 Dongxinjing Village
 Yamenmiao Village
 Suobeishan Village
 Shuiquangou Village
 Shisanhao Village
 Beijing Village
 Mantou'aobao Village
 Fushan Village
 Baiyingou Village
 Xinglongzhuang Village
 Baiyingaoluo Village
 Taipingzhuang Village
 Daolaomaodao Village

Demographics 
Lindong has approximately 18,000 households, hosting a population of about 68,000 people, giving the town an average household size of 3.78 people. The town's population represents 19% of Balin Left Banner's total.

Economy 
According to the government of the Balin Left Banner, Lindong is a largely agricultural town. The largest industries in the town are vegetable farming, donkey husbandry, and broom production. The town has about 100 private enterprises, of which, 53 are identified by the banner government as small and medium enterprises.

Agriculture 

The per capita annual disposable income of the town's farmers and herders in 2019 totaled 12,521 renminbi.

As of 2019, the town raised approximately 190,000 heads of livestock, and grew 3,000 mu of vegetables.

There are six wholesale markets in Lindong.

Electricity generation 
In order to promote economic growth, the banner government has launched a plan to expand agricultural facilities, construct a dam, and build a photovoltaic power plant within Lindong.

Tourism 

The Liao Shangjing Museum in the town, just west of the ruins of Shangjing, showcase 113,885 cultural relics, including many representative of the Khitan culture, the ethnic group the Liao dynasty was run by. The banner government also recognizes rural tourism as an important economic sector for Lindong.

Transportation 
Multiple commercial bus providers service a route from Lindong to Beijing, which is approximately 780 kilometers in length.

References 

Inner Mongolia

Chifeng
Township-level divisions of Inner Mongolia